Alfredo Montori (1893-1969) was an Italian art director. He designed the sets for more than a hundred films.

Selected filmography
 My Little One (1933)
 Lady of Paradise (1934)
 The Ferocious Saladin (1937)
 A Lady Did It (1938)
 They've Kidnapped a Man (1938)
 The Knight of San Marco (1939)
 The Faceless Voice (1939)
 The Hussar Captain (1940)
 A Husband for the Month of April (1941)
 The Two Tigers (1941)
 Music on the Run (1943)
 Flying Squadron (1949)
 The Cliff of Sin (1950)
 Beauties on Bicycles (1951)
 Without a Flag (1951)
 Tragic Serenade (1951)
 The Black Captain (1951)
 Mamma Mia, What an Impression! (1951)
 Abracadabra (1952)
 The Legend of the Piave (1952)
 Naples Sings (1953)
 Tragic Ballad (1954)
 Letter from Naples (1954)
 It Takes Two to Sin in Love (1954)
 Goodbye Naples (1955)
 The Knight of the Black Sword (1956)
 The Son of the Red Corsair (1959)

References

Bibliography 
 Gary Allen Smith. Epic Films: Casts, Credits and Commentary on More Than 350 Spectacle Movies. McFarland, 2004.

External links 
 

1893 births
1969 deaths
Italian art directors
Film people from Rome